NGC 6215 (also known as PGC 59112) is a spiral galaxy located in the constellation Ara. It is designated as SA(s)c in the galaxy morphological classification scheme. It was discovered by astronomer John Herschel on 9 July 1836.

Galaxy group information
NGC 6215 is part of galaxy group NGC 6221/15, which includes barred spiral galaxy NGC 6221 and three dwarf galaxies. A  bridge of neutral hydrogen gas connects NGC 6215 and 6221 as a result of their interaction, and Dwarf 3 of the three dwarf galaxies may have formed from the bridging gas.

See also
List of NGC objects (6001-7000)
List of NGC objects

References

Unbarred spiral galaxies
6215
59112
Ara (constellation)